The Shire of Broomehill-Tambellup is a local government area in the Great Southern region of Western Australia,  south-southeast of the state capital, Perth. It came into existence in 2008 through the amalgamation of the former Shire of Broomehill and Shire of Tambellup.

History

Shire of Broomehill

The Broomehill Road Board was gazetted on 19 May 1892. On 1 July 1961, it became a shire following changes to the Local Government Act.

Shire of Tambellup

The Tambellup Road Board was gazetted in 1905 upon a petition by local residents to separate from the Broomehill Road District. On 1 July 1961, it became a shire following changes to the Local Government Act.

Amalgamation
On 3 September 2007, the Local Government Advisory Board confirmed that the Shires of Broomehill and Tambellup were looking to merge. A proposal put forward by the Shire of Katanning to absorb Woodanilling, Broomehill and Tambellup was rejected by the other councils. A six-week public submission period was conducted in November and December 2007.

On 8 February 2008, the two Shires held a combined special meeting and resolved to recommend to the Board, who had originally proposed a system without wards, that the new Shire have two wards—North Ward, with four councillors, representing Broomehill, and South Ward, with five councillors, representing Tambellup. The Minister accepted the proposal on 17 April 2008, and the Broomehill-Tambellup District Order 2008 was approved by the Governor in Council on 27 May 2008.

The councillors of both local government authorities resigned at the end of June 2008, and elections for the new local government took place on 18 October 2008.

Wards
The Shire is divided into two wards—North Ward, with four councillors, representing Broomehill, and South Ward, with five councillors, representing Tambellup.

Towns and localities
The towns and localities of the Shire of Broomehill-Tambellup with population and size figures based on the most recent Australian census:

Heritage-listed places

As of 2023, 215 places are heritage-listed in the Shire of Broomehill-Tambellup, of which five are on the State Register of Heritage Places.

References

External links
 

Broomehill-Tambellup